Valent is both a surname and a given name. Notable people with the name include:

Dacia Valent (1963–2015), Italian politician
Dmitry Valent (born 1988), Belarusian kickboxer
Eric Valent (born 1977), American baseball player and coach
Géjza Valent (born 1953), Czechoslovak discus thrower
Martin Valent, Argentine polo player
Michal Valent (born 1986), Slovakian ice hockey player
Roman Valent (born 1983), Swiss tennis player
Valent Sinković (born 1988), Croatian rower